Callum Williams (born 31 October 2001) is a Welsh rugby union player for Scarlets in the United Rugby Championship. Williams' primary position is wing or fullback.

Rugby Union career

Professional career

Williams was named in the Scarlets academy squad for the 2021–22 season. He is yet to debut for the Scarlets, but has represented Wales Sevens at one tournament.

References

External links
 
 

2001 births
Living people
Scarlets players
Rugby union wings
Rugby union fullbacks
Welsh rugby union players
Rugby union players from Haverfordwest
Rugby sevens players at the 2022 Commonwealth Games